K. V. Ramalingam is an Indian politician and former member of the Tamil Nadu legislative assembly elected from Erode West constituency in 2011 and 2016. He served as the Minister of Public Works Department and Minister of Sports and Youth Welfare of Tamil Nadu from 2011 to 2013  He represents Anna Dravida Munnetra Kazhagam party.

He was also the Member of Rajyasabha from (June2010-May2011) in AIADMK.

References 

Members of the Tamil Nadu Legislative Assembly
All India Anna Dravida Munnetra Kazhagam politicians
Living people
Year of birth missing (living people)